In Greek mythology, Gorge(comes from the adjective gorgos, "terrible" or "horrible") may refer to:

Gorge, a Libyan princess as one of the Danaïdes, daughters of King Danaus. Her mother was either the hamadryads Atlanteia or Phoebe and thus, probably the full sister of Hippodamia, Rhodia, Cleopatra, Asteria, Hippodamia, Glauce, Hippomedusa, Iphimedusa and Rhode. She married and murdered Hippothous, son of Aegyptus.
Gorge, a Calydonian princess as the daughter of King Oeneus and Althaea, daughter of King Thestius of Pleuron. She was the sister of Deianeira, Meleager, Toxeus, Clymenus, Periphas, Agelaus (or Ageleus), Thyreus (or Phereus or Pheres), Eurymede and Melanippe. Gorge married Andraemon and became the mother of a son Thoas who led the Aetolian contingent for the Greeks in the Trojan War. Artemis changed her sisters into birds because of their constant mourning over the death of their brother Meleager, but spared Gorge and Deianeira. Apollodorus says that according to Pisander, she was the mother of Tydeus by her own father Oeneus, because "Zeus willed it that Oeneus should fall in love with his own daughter".
Gorge, a woman of Lemnos who slew Elymus the night Lemnian women killed their men.
Gorge, a Maenad in the retinue of Dionysus during his Indian campaign.

Notes

References
 Antoninus Liberalis, The Metamorphoses of Antoninus Liberalis translated by Francis Celoria (Routledge 1992). Online version at the Topos Text Project.
Apollodorus, The Library with an English Translation by Sir James George Frazer, F.B.A., F.R.S. in 2 Volumes, Cambridge, MA, Harvard University Press; London, William Heinemann Ltd. 1921. ISBN 0-674-99135-4. Online version at the Perseus Digital Library. Greek text available from the same website.
Hesiod, Catalogue of Women from Homeric Hymns, Epic Cycle, Homerica translated by Evelyn-White, H G. Loeb Classical Library Volume 57. London: William Heinemann, 1914. Online version at theio.com
Homer, The Iliad with an English Translation by A.T. Murray, Ph.D. in two volumes. Cambridge, MA., Harvard University Press; London, William Heinemann, Ltd. 1924. . Online version at the Perseus Digital Library.
Homer, Homeri Opera in five volumes. Oxford, Oxford University Press. 1920. . Greek text available at the Perseus Digital Library.
Nonnus of Panopolis, Dionysiaca translated by William Henry Denham Rouse (1863-1950), from the Loeb Classical Library, Cambridge, MA, Harvard University Press, 1940.  Online version at the Topos Text Project.
Nonnus of Panopolis, Dionysiaca. 3 Vols. W.H.D. Rouse. Cambridge, MA., Harvard University Press; London, William Heinemann, Ltd. 1940-1942. Greek text available at the Perseus Digital Library.
Pausanias, Description of Greece with an English Translation by W.H.S. Jones, Litt.D., and H.A. Ormerod, M.A., in 4 Volumes. Cambridge, MA, Harvard University Press; London, William Heinemann Ltd. 1918. . Online version at the Perseus Digital Library
Pausanias, Graeciae Descriptio. 3 vols. Leipzig, Teubner. 1903.  Greek text available at the Perseus Digital Library.
Publius Ovidius Naso, Metamorphoses translated by Brookes More (1859-1942). Boston, Cornhill Publishing Co. 1922. Online version at the Perseus Digital Library.  Publius Ovidius Naso, Metamorphoses. Hugo Magnus. Gotha (Germany). Friedr. Andr. Perthes. 1892. Latin text available at the Perseus Digital Library.
Publius Papinius Statius, The Thebaid translated by John Henry Mozley. Loeb Classical Library Volumes. Cambridge, MA, Harvard University Press; London, William Heinemann Ltd. 1928. Online version at the Topos Text Project.
Publius Papinius Statius, The Thebaid. Vol I-II. John Henry Mozley. London: William Heinemann; New York: G.P. Putnam's Sons. 1928. Latin text available at the Perseus Digital Library.
Smith, William; Dictionary of Greek and Roman Biography and Mythology, London (1873). "Gorge"

Danaids
Princesses in Greek mythology
Maenads
Companions of Dionysus
Aetolian characters in Greek mythology
Incest in Greek mythology